Saukiidae is a family of trilobites of the Asaphida order.

These fast-moving low-level epifaunal deposit feeders lived in the Cambrian and Ordovician periods, from 494.0 to 478.6 Ma.

Genera
Anderssonella Kobayashi 1936
Calvinella Walcott 1914
Diemanosaukia Jago and Corbett 1990
Linguisaukia Peng 1984
Lophosaukia Shergold 1971
Mictosaukia Shergold 1975
Prosaukia Ulrich and Resser 1933
Pseudocalvinella Qiu 1984
Saukia Walcott 1914
Saukiella Ulrich and Resser 1933
Stigmaspis Nelson 1951
Tellerina Ulrich and Resser 1933

References

 
Dikelokephaloidea
Trilobite families
Cambrian first appearances
Cambrian extinctions